Da Vinci Schools is a public school network in Los Angeles, California with five schools and one college and career program serving 2,400+ students from 122 zip codes. 

In Fall 2017, Da Vinci Communications, Da Vinci Design and Da Vinci Science high schools co-located to a new Wiseburn campus at 201 N. Douglas Street, El Segundo, CA. Da Vinci Schools operate the high schools for the Wiseburn Unified School District in a unique district-charter partnership model. 

Da Vinci Schools are fully accredited by the Western Association of Schools & Colleges (WASC) and are a member of the Coalition of Essential Schools.

Schools
Da Vinci Connect (TK-8) is a public school offering families a unique learning model that combine homeschool and on-campus instruction using project-based and social emotional learning. 

Da Vinci Connect High School is a public school that combines in-person and remote learning. Students can get a jump start on college by earning a two- or four-year college degree while in high school, for free.  

Da Vinci Communications High School offers a college-prep, project-based, real-world curriculum with career pathways in computer science, multimedia journalism, marketing, and media production.

Da Vinci Design High School offers a college-prep, project-based, real-world curriculum with career pathways in architecture, entrepreneurship, and graphic design.

Da Vinci Science High School offers a college-prep, project-based, real-world curriculum with career pathways in mechanical engineering, civil engineering, and biomedical engineering.

Da Vinci RISE High offers an individualized education for students experiencing foster care, housing instability, the juvenile justice system, and other youth who have struggled in a traditional school setting.

Da Vinci Extension is a college and career program. Da Vinci students can earn an Associate's degree, Bachelor's degree or transferable college credit for free, in partnership with Southern New Hampshire University, UCLA Extension, and El Camino College.

Curriculum & philosophy
Da Vinci Schools' graduation requirements are aligned with the UC/Cal State admission requirements. 94% of the Class of 2020 graduates met the UC and CSU “A-G” requirements for admission (51% above the national average); 76% of graduates received four-year university offers (2015-2019). 84% of Da Vinci graduates enroll in college immediately after high school, 20% above state and 15% above the national average. In 2020, Da Vinci Extension graduated its first student with a bachelor's degree from Southern New Hampshire University, at no cost and with no debt.

Community partnerships
Da Vinci Schools has partnered with many corporate, nonprofit and education institutions. Community partners offer students and faculty access to expert knowledge, industry-specific curriculum, internship opportunities, mentoring, teacher training, dual enrollment programs, career guidance, volunteer support, direct funding, and much more.

Some of Da Vinci Schools’ partners include:  Northrop Grumman, Belkin International, The Boeing Company, Chevron Corporation, Raytheon, SpaceX, Gensler, 72andSunny, Karten Design, Project Lead the Way, El Camino College, UCLA Extension, Southern New Hampshire University, Cal Poly San Luis Obispo, Loyola Marymount University, and many more.

Advisory
Every student is enrolled in an Advisory class for the full 4 years of high school that includes students from 9-12 grade. The advisory class is a place where students can bond with each other, get academic support, and have a safe place to share their feelings.

Seminars (electives)
Seminar classes (similar to electives) are practical, real-world non-core classes. Some recent seminar classes have included:  Architecture and Design, Vehicle Design, Puppetry, Toy Design, Game Theory, Product and Industrial Design, Web Programming, Robotics, Flight School, Aerospace Engineering, Rocketry, Creative Writing, Leadership, Youth and Government, Drama, Yearbook, CrossFit, Yoga, Photography, and many more.

Extracurricular activities
Da Vinci Schools offer extracurricular activities, including CIF sports, after-school clubs, music, CrossFit, and more.

References

External links 
 

High schools in Los Angeles
Coalition of Essential Schools
Charter school organizations based in California
Education reform
Educational institutions established in 2009
Charter K-12 schools in California
2009 establishments in California